Toto's First Night (Italian: Totò di notte n. 1) is a 1962 Italian musical comedy film directed by Mario Amendola and starring Totò and Erminio Macario.

Plot 
Ninì and Mimi are two friends, itinerant players, who can not make a penny. It is performed at night, in various places, arousing only the laughter of the public, until Mimi is delivered the conspicuous legacy of his uncle. Ninì immediately takes the opportunity to re-launch the duo in nightclubs, but squanders all the money in goliardic parties.

Cast
 Totò as Nini  
 Erminio Macario as Mimi Makò  
 Margaret Lee 
 Helmut Zacharias 
 Mac Ronay 
 Dodo' D'Amburg 
 Pascaline 
 Caroline Lecerf 
 Moa Tahi 
 Karin Koidl 
 Margaret Rose Keil 
 Caroline Cherie 
 Madame Arthur
 Dori Dorika
 Don Lurio

References

Bibliography
 Ennio Bìspuri. Totò: principe clown : tutti i film di Totò. Guida Editori, 1997.

External links

1962 films
1962 musical comedy films
Italian musical comedy films
1960s Italian-language films
Films directed by Mario Amendola
Films with screenplays by Giovanni Grimaldi
Films with screenplays by Bruno Corbucci
Films scored by Armando Trovajoli
1960s Italian films